National Highway 753M, commonly referred to as NH 753M is a national highway in  India. It is a spur road of National Highway 53. NH-753M traverses the state of Maharashtra in India.

Route 

Chikhali, Dhad, Mahora, Bhokardan, Hasanbad - NH752H.

Junctions  

  Terminal near Chikhli.
  Terminal near Hasanbad.

See also 

 List of National Highways in India
 List of National Highways in India by state

References

External links 

 NH 753M on OpenStreetMap

National highways in India
National Highways in Maharashtra